The Twelfth Baptist Church is a historic church in the Roxbury neighborhood of Boston, Massachusetts. Established in 1840, it is the oldest direct descendant of the First Independent Baptist Church in Beacon Hill. Notable members have included abolitionists such as Lewis Hayden and Rev. Leonard Grimes, the historian George Washington Williams, the artist Edward Mitchell Bannister and abolitionist and entrepreneur Christiana Carteaux, pioneering educator Wilhelmina Crosson, and civil rights movement leader Dr. Martin Luther King Jr.

History

The Twelfth Baptist Church was established in 1840 when a group of 36 dissenters broke with the First Independent Baptist Church, which met in what is now known as the African Meeting House. The exact reason for the split is not clear. According to some historians, the dissenters wanted to take a more aggressive stand against slavery than the other members. In addition, the First Independent Baptist Church had not had a permanent minister for some time, which may have given rise to general disagreements as to how to run the church. 

Led by Rev. George H. Black, a Baptist minister and native of the West Indies, the new congregation moved to Phillips Street in Beacon Hill. The Rev. Leonard Grimes was ordained as its first pastor in 1848. Grimes was an abolitionist and Underground Railroad conductor who had served two years in prison for attempting to rescue a family of slaves in Virginia. Under his leadership, the church became known as "The Fugitive Slave Church." Scores of escaped slaves were aided by the church, and many chose to join the congregation. Early members included Lewis and Harriet Hayden, Shadrach Minkins, Anthony Burns, Thomas Sims, Peter Randolph, and John S. Rock. Grimes served as pastor until his death in 1873.

In 1907, the church moved to the former Jewish temple Mishkan Tefila at 47 Shawmut Avenue in Roxbury. It later moved to its current location at 150-160 Warren Street. 

The church has had many notable pastors and members. Rev. George Washington Williams, its second pastor, was a Civil War veteran, lawyer, journalist, and groundbreaking historian. Williams wrote a history of the church in 1874. Rev. J. Allen Kirk wrote an oft-cited account of the Wilmington massacre of 1898. Rev. Matthew A. N. Shaw was president of the National Equal Rights League of Boston, and organized the Negro Sanhedrin conference of 1924. 

Noted educator Wilhelmina Crosson taught Sunday School at the Twelfth Baptist Church in the 1940s. One of the first African-American female schoolteachers in Boston, Crosson developed the city's first remedial reading program, and was an early advocate of black history education.

Rev. William Hunter Hester wrote a history of the Twelfth Baptist Church in 1946. In the 1950s, he worked with a young assistant minister who was pursuing doctoral studies in theology at Boston University: Martin Luther King Jr. Hester was an old friend of King's father, and was an important influence on King.

Rev. Dr. Michael E. Haynes was active in the civil rights movement and represented Roxbury in the Massachusetts House of Representatives in the 1960s. Haynes was instrumental in founding the Boston/Roxbury campus of Godron-Conwell Theological Seminary -- known as the Center for Urban Ministerial Education (CUME) -- in 1976 to provide "ministerial training for Hispanic/Latino, African American, Asian and other ethnic minority pastors and church leaders in Boston and throughout the U.S."

On September 20th 2021, King Boston donated $1 million to support the church.

Pastors 
Pastors of the Twelfth Baptist Church to date: 
 Rev. Leonard Grimes (1848–1874)
 Rev. George Washington Williams (1874–1876)
 Rev. Williams Dennis (1876–1880)
 Rev. L. F. Walden (1880–1885)
 Rev. Robert Fairfax (1886–1890)
 Rev. H. H. Harris (1890–1891)
 Rev. J. Allen Kirk (1891–1894)
 Rev. John R. McCenny (1894)
 Rev. Matthew A. N. Shaw (1894–1922)
 Rev. William Hunter Hester (1923–1964)
 Rev. Dr. Michael E. Haynes (1964–2004)
 Rev. Dr. Arthur T. Gerald, Jr. (2010–Present)

References

Further reading

External links 
 

Baptist churches in Boston
African-American history in Boston
1840 establishments in Massachusetts